Lee Heung-sil (born July 10, 1961) is a former South Korean footballer

Club career 
He spent his entire playing career in POSCO Atoms.
He was awarded the Best Young K-League Player of the Year in 1985.  In the following year, he broke K-League's infamous sophomore jinx by winning the MVP.

Career statistics

External links
 
 
 

1961 births
Living people
South Korean footballers
South Korean football managers
1990 FIFA World Cup players
Pohang Steelers players
K League 1 Most Valuable Player Award winners
K League 1 players
Association football midfielders
South Korea international footballers
Jeonbuk Hyundai Motors managers
Ansan Mugunghwa FC managers
Ansan Greeners FC managers
Sportspeople from South Gyeongsang Province
Viettel FC managers